Kabye may refer to:
 Kabye people
 Kabye language

Language and nationality disambiguation pages